Jorja-An Fox  is an American actress and producer. She first came to prominence with a recurring role in the NBC medical drama ER as Dr. Maggie Doyle from 1996 to 1999. This was followed by another critical success in the recurring role of Secret Service Agent Gina Toscano in the NBC political drama The West Wing in 2000. She played Sara Sidle in the CBS police procedural drama CSI: Crime Scene Investigation, both as a regular (2000–2007, 2010–2015) and recurring (2008–2010) cast member. She reprised the role in the sequel CSI: Vegas, which premiered on October 6, 2021.

Early life
Fox was born in New York City to Montreal-born parents Edward and Marilyn Fox and is of French-Canadian, Belgian and Irish descent. She was raised on a narrow barrier island in Melbourne Beach, Florida. She has an older brother, Jeff. She describes herself as being overweight while growing up, with a prominent gap between her teeth. By her 20s, she observed that neither her wisdom teeth nor braces had appreciably helped (although wisdom teeth are no longer considered as causing crowding of the anterior teeth), and Fox said "forget it."

After attending Melbourne High School for two years, she began a modeling career after winning a local contest. She subsequently enrolled as a drama student at the Lee Strasberg Institute in New York City, under the tutelage of actor William Hickey.

Career
Fox had minor roles in films and television series, including the opening scene of a 1993 episode of the NBC legal drama Law & Order. Fox's big break was a recurring role in the third, fourth and fifth seasons (1996–99) of the NBC medical drama ER. She played Dr. Maggie Doyle, a lesbian, no-nonsense and vegetarian emergency intern. 

Fox appeared in "The Puppy Episode Part 2", the April 30, 1997 episode of the sitcom Ellen, in which that series' main character came out as gay. 

From 1999 to 2000, she had a recurring role as Secret Service Agent Gina Toscano in the first and second seasons of the NBC political drama The West Wing.

Fox has appeared in the films Velocity Trap and Food for the Heart and she also briefly appeared in Memento, playing the main character's wife in flashback footage.

CSI
In 2000, she gained a regular role on the CBS police procedural drama CSI: Crime Scene Investigation as Sara Sidle, a Las Vegas forensic scientist.

She and her CSI co-star George Eads were fired from the show in 2004. Fox had allegedly failed to submit a letter to CBS confirming that she would be on time for shooting. The disputes were resolved in just over a week, and the two were rehired by CBS, but neither Fox or Eads' salary was raised, in spite of other cast members receiving raises. It was also reported that of the two, Fox was approached first to resume her contract with CSI, but she refused until Eads was rehired as well.

On April 18, 2007, TV Guide began reporting that Fox might not be returning for the eighth season of CSI, having not yet signed a new contract. The seventh season finale turned out to be a cliffhanger involving her character, Sara Sidle. The New York Post reported that Fox did not show up to film the finale because of ongoing issues over her employment. Neither CBS nor Jorja's agent confirmed the allegations. 

In September 2007, after rumors emerged about Fox's departure from the show, an online forum called "Your Tax Dollars at Work", started a campaign to keep Sara Sidle on CSI; the campaign (called Dollars for Sense) includes mailing the show's producers a dollar so as to keep Fox on the show. With the help of donations, the campaign also organized plane flyovers over the Universal Studios lot in California where CSI is filmed. The banners read "Keep Jorja Fox on CBS". On October 15, 2007, Fox told Entertainment Weekly that she left CSI, saying that she wanted a break "from the commitment of a weekly television series." Fox requested that the money collected during the "Dollars for Sense" campaign be donated to CASA, an organization dedicated to aiding foster children.  On November 15, 2007, the episode "Goodbye and Good Luck" marked the character's final regular appearance in an episode of CSI until the show entered its tenth season.

In May 2008, Fox returned for CSI'''s ninth season as a guest star. After coming back for the first, second, and fifth episodes, she returned for William Petersen's last episode as the star ("One To Go") in the last scene, when Gil Grissom (Petersen) turns up in the jungle, surprising Sara, and in the episode finish wherein the two shared a passionate kiss.

In the summer of 2009, CBS announced that Fox would be returning to CSI. Fox was initially scheduled to appear in the tenth season premiere ("Family Affair," which aired September 24, 2009) and four additional episodes. However, executive producer Carol Mendelsohn confirmed that Fox's stay had been made "more permanent" and her role extended indefinitely. By July 2011, Fox was confirmed as a full-time, regular cast member again on CSI for the twelfth season, but she was added back to the opening credits for the eleventh season. She remained in the main cast until the show ended after the fifteenth season in September 2015.

After CSI
After leaving CSI in 2007, Fox produced the musical Stay Forever: The Life and Music of Dusty Springfield starring Kirsten Holly Smith, about the tension between the public image and private life of bisexual musician Dusty Springfield, which played at the Renberg Theatre in the Los Angeles Gay and Lesbian Center.

Fox guest-starred in the Lifetime sitcom Drop Dead Diva. The episode, which aired on August 16, 2009, had her playing a soccer mom with a criminal past. She also did a modeling shoot for Green With Glamour. Fox is the co-founder of Honeypot Productions, an independent avant-garde theatre company in Los Angeles that has produced five original plays. Her friend and HoneyPot co-founder Heather Reid wrote Dear Bernard, which Fox helped produce.

Fox is a musician; she plays guitar (badly, she says) and has a drum kit. She sings and writes songs, most notably the song "Lullabye" for the movie Traveling Companion as well as the song "Satellite," which she published on her official web site. Fox and her CSI co-star Marg Helgenberger sang "Stand by Me" as a duet at the fourth annual benefit called "What A Pair 4—A Celebration of Women's Duets" to benefit breast cancer research at the John Wayne Cancer Institute. It was held Sunday June 11, 2006, at the Wiltern/LG Theatre.

Activism and politics
Fox is a supporter of the Human Rights Campaign and has been a dedicated vegetarian since the age of 19, working with PETA to help promote vegetarianism and also working with ADI to bring light to the suffering of animals in circuses. She has a purse named after her by the Montréal company Matt & Nat, which designs vegan purses. Fox attended and read at the Los Angeles book launch of Karen Dawn's Thanking The Monkey, and was seen on Access Hollywood discussing how being vegetarian helps the environment. In 2008, Fox volunteered her time to film a Public Service Announcement for the New York–based non-profit Orangutan Outreach, which supports Borneo Orangutan Survival and other projects aimed at ensuring the orangutan's continued survival. The 30-second clip was shown on Animal Planet during the award-winning series Orangutan Island''.

Filmography

Film

Television

Video games

Awards and nominations

References

External links

 
 
 
 Access Hollywood Thanking the Monkey Book Launch Video

20th-century American actresses
21st-century American actresses
Actresses from Florida
Actresses from New York City
American film actresses
American musical theatre actresses
American people of Belgian descent
American people of French-Canadian descent
American people of Irish descent
American television actresses
Lee Strasberg Theatre and Film Institute alumni
Living people
Melbourne High School alumni
People from Melbourne Beach, Florida
Singers from Florida
Singers from New York City
Year of birth missing (living people)